Amandola is a comune (municipality) in the Province of Fermo in the Italian region Marche, located about  south of Ancona, about  northwest of Ascoli Piceno and about  west of Fermo. 
The town was founded in 1248 by the union of the castles of Agello Leone and Marrubbione, which formed   a free municipality.

Amandola is one of the 18 Italian municipalities located within the Monti Sibillini National Park.

Amandola was damaged by the earthquake in Central Italy (near Amatrice) on 24 August 2016.

References

External links

 Official website
I Comuni del Parco Nazionale dei Monti Sibillini

Hilltowns in the Marche